The Good Life is a role-playing video game developed by Japanese studio White Owls Inc. and published by Playism for Microsoft Windows, Xbox One, Nintendo Switch and PlayStation 4, and released on 15 October 2021.

Gameplay
The game involves playing the role of Naomi Hayward, a journalist from New York who, after accumulating a debt of £30,000,000, has been sent to investigate a small village in the north of England called Rainy Woods believed to have a secret, in which the population is able to transform into cats and dogs. Naomi also eventually learns this ability too. The player must take photographs of various things in the game and upload them on the Internet in order to make money, and is also given many side quests to complete, in addition to the game's main quest.

Development
The game was developed by Japanese studio White Owls, and the project was led by Hidetaka Suehiro, the director of Deadly Premonition, and Yukio Futatsugi, the creator of the Panzer Dragoon series. The studio launched a failed crowdfunding campaign on Fig, though a subsequent crowdfunding campaign via Kickstarter was successful. While the game was originally set to be published by The Irregular Corporation, Playism announced that it had taken over publishing duties in June 2021. While the game was initially set to be released in 2019, it was delayed several times. The game was released for Microsoft Windows, Xbox One, Nintendo Switch, and PlayStation 4 on October 15, 2021.

Reception
The game received "mixed or average reviews" upon release according to review aggregator Metacritic.

References

Windows games
Xbox One games
2021 video games
PlayStation 4 games
Nintendo Switch games
Photography games
Role-playing video games
Single-player video games
Video games about cats
Video games about dogs
Video games about shapeshifting
Video games developed in Japan
Video games set in England
Kickstarter-funded video games
Playism games